Robert Steele or Rob Steele may refer to:

 Robert Steele, (1745–1830) Scottish shipbuilder, founder of Robert Steele & Company, 1815
Robert Steele (drum major) (1760–1833), American Revolutionary War drummer and drum major
Robert Steele (Pitt Principal), principal of the University of Pittsburgh, 1800–1801
Robert Williamson Steele (1820–1901), governor of the extralegal Jefferson Territory, U.S.A, 1859–1861
Robert Steele (medievalist) (1860–1944), editor of the works of Roger Bacon
Robert Steele (sailor) (1893-1969), British Olympic sailor
Robert Cecil Steele (1903–1976), Canadian politician in the Legislative Assembly of British Columbia
Lanny Steele (Robert L. Steele, 1933–1994), American jazz pianist
Robert H. Steele (born 1938), U.S. Representative for Connecticut, 1970–1975
Robert David Steele (1952–2021), former CIA officer and conspiracy theorist
Robert Steele (American football) (born 1956), former NFL wide receiver
Robert Steele (politician) (1961–2017), commissioner of Cook County, Illinois
 Rob Steele (actor) (died 2022), Australian actor, in Muriel's Wedding (1994)
 Rob Steele, Republican candidate in the 2010 United States House of Representatives elections in Michigan#District 15

See also
Bob Steele (disambiguation)
Bobby Steele (born 1956), American musician
Robert Steel (disambiguation)